Chuvanna Kannukal is a 1990 Indian Malayalam film directed by Sasi Mohan and produced by Chaithanya Arts. The film has a musical score by Jerry Amaldev.

Cast
Master Raghu
Kapil
V. K. Sreeraman
Jagathi Sreekumar
Mala Aravindan
Abhilasha
Uma maheswari
Sugandhi
Shyamala
Padma

Soundtrack
The music was composed by Jerry Amaldev and the lyrics were written by Poovachal Khader.

References

External links
 

1990 films
1990s Malayalam-language films